Pochabany is a village and municipality in the Bánovce nad Bebravou District of  the Trenčín Region of Slovakia.

References

External links
  Official page

Villages and municipalities in Bánovce nad Bebravou District